Glendale Falls may refer to:

Glendale Falls (Hamilton, Ontario)
Glendale Falls (Massachusetts)